Urodacus planimanus is a species of scorpion in the Urodacidae family. It is endemic to Australia, and was first described in 1893 by British zoologist Reginald Innes Pocock.

Distribution and habitat
The species occurs in south-west Western Australia.

References

 

 
planimanus
Scorpions of Australia
Endemic fauna of Australia
Fauna of Western Australia
Animals described in 1893
Taxa named by R. I. Pocock